Jan Egil Andresen (born 25 September 1978) is a Norwegian cross-country skier, born in Mo i Rana. He competed at the Winter Olympics in Turin in 2006, placing 27th in the 30 km and 41st in the 50 km.

Cross-country skiing results
All results are sourced from the International Ski Federation (FIS).

Olympic Games

World Championships

World Cup

Season standings

References

External links

1978 births
Living people
People from Rana, Norway
Cross-country skiers at the 2006 Winter Olympics
Norwegian male cross-country skiers
Olympic cross-country skiers of Norway
Sportspeople from Nordland